According to Jewish and Islamic tradition, Zuleikha (also spelled Zuleika, Zuleykha, or Suleika) was the name of Potiphar's wife. These names may also refer to:

 Zuleika (given name), a list of people and fictional characters
 563 Suleika, a minor planet orbiting the sun
 Suleika Jaouad, an American writer and motivational speaker
 Zuleika Dobson, a novel Zuleika Dobson by Max Beerbohm
 Zuleika (musical), a 1954 musical based on the novel Zuleika Dobson
 Zuleikha (novel), the 2015 debut novel of Guzel Yakhina
 Zuleykha, a 2005 Maldivian romantic drama film
 Zuleika (moth), a genus of moths in the family Geometridae
 Zuleika, a New Zealand sloop which foundered during the Storm of 1897 with the loss of 12 lives